The Mania Tour (stylized as M A  N   I    A Tour) was a headlining concert tour by Fall Out Boy, in support of the group's seventh studio album Mania (2018). The tour started with a special intimate show in Chicago on September 16, 2017, and concluded in New Orleans on October 10, 2018.

Background and development 
On April 27, 2017, the band released the first single and music video for "Young and Menace". With the release came the announcement of a fall arena tour. On July 13, 2017, the band announced a leg in Oceania, which is scheduled to take place in 2018. On January 19, 2018, Fall Out Boy announced the show at Wrigley Field, which took place on September 8, 2018.

Set list 
This set list is from the concert on September 8, 2018 in Chicago. It is not intended to represent all shows from the tour.

"Disloyal Order of Water Buffaloes"
"The Phoenix"
"Irresistible"
"Sugar, We're Goin Down"
"American Beauty/American Psycho"
"Immortals"
"Lake Effect Kid"
"Stay Frosty Royal Milk Tea"
"Thriller"
"Uma Thurman"
"Save Rock and Roll"
"The Last of the Real Ones"
"Young and Menace"
"Dance, Dance"
"Wilson (Expensive Mistakes)"
"Thnks fr th Mmrs"
"I Don't Care"
"This Ain't a Scene, It's an Arms Race"
"Chicago Is So Two Years Ago"
"Champion"
"Grand Theft Autumn/Where Is Your Boy"
"Centuries"
Encore
"My Songs Know What You Did in the Dark (Light Em Up)"
"Saturday"

Tour dates

Notes

References 

2017 concert tours
2018 concert tours
Fall Out Boy